Night is the period in which the sun is below the horizon.

Night or Nights may also refer to:

People
Candice Night (born 1971), American vocalist/lyricist
Rebecca Night (born 1985), British actress
M. Night Shyamalan (born 1970), Indian-born American film director

Art
The Night (Beckmann), a 20th-century painting by German artist Max Beckmann
Night (Michelangelo), a 1526–1531 sculpture by Michelangelo

Film and television
Night (1930 film), animated short
"Night" (Star Trek: Voyager), a 1998 episode of Star Trek: Voyager
Night, a 2004 Australian film
"Night" (The Handmaid's Tale season 1 episode)
"Night" (The Handmaid's Tale season 3 episode)

Games
Nights (character), the main character in the video games  Nights into Dreams... and Nights: Journey of Dreams
Nights into Dreams, the first game in the series, for the Sega Saturn
Nights: Journey of Dreams, the second game in the series, for the Wii console

Literature
Al-Lail ("Night" or "The Night"), the ninety-second sura of the Qur'an
Night (memoir), a 1956 (Yiddish), 1960 (English) book by Elie Wiesel
Night (O'Brien novel), a 1972 novel by Edna O'Brien
Night (sketch), a 1969 short play by Harold Pinter
"Night" (Blake), a poem by Robert Blake poem from the 1789 collection Songs of Innocence

Music

Performers
Night (rock band), a band from the late 1970s and early 1980s
Night (Nepali band)

Albums
Night (John Abercrombie album), 1984
Night (Kino album), 1986
Night (Misako Odani album), 2003
Night, by Gazpacho, 2007
Night (Holly Cole album), 2012
Night (George Winston album), 2022

Songs
"Night" (Mussorgsky song), an 1864 song by composer Mussorgsky
"Night" (Rubinstein song), a 1940s song by composer Anton Rubinstein
"Night" (Jackie Wilson song), 1960
"Night" (Bruce Springsteen song), from the 1975 album Born to Run
"Night" (Janet Jackson song), 2015
"Nights" (Lindisfarne song), 1982
"Nights" (Ed Bruce song), 1986
"Nights" (Frank Ocean song), from the 2016 album Blonde
"Night", a 1950s song by Edwin McArthur
"Night", by the American band Bright from the 2005 album Bells Break Their Towers

Other uses
Night, Alberta, Canada
Night (hieroglyph)

See also
The Night (disambiguation)
Night and Day (disambiguation)
Darkest Night (disambiguation)
Longest Night (disambiguation)
Night After Night (disambiguation)
List of night deities, some of whom are known by names also meaning "night"